Herrscher may refer to:

People 
Enrique Herrscher (born 1944), Argentine economist, systems scientist, and professor
Rick Herrscher (born 1936), American baseball player

Other uses 
 Der Herrscher, a 1937 German film
 Herrschers, characters in the video game Honkai Impact 3rd

See also
 Herscher (disambiguation)